The Balcony is a play by Jean Genet.

The Balcony may also refer to:

 The Balcony (film), a 1963 film adaptation of the play
 The Balcony (painting), an 1868 oil painting by Manet
 The Balcony (album), a 2014 album by Catfish and the Bottlemen
An area on Mount Everest

See also
Balcony (disambiguation)
Balconi (disambiguation)
Balconie Castle, formerly spelled Balcony